Khaw Soo Cheang (1797-1882), other names Khaw Teng Hai and Kor Su Jiang, was born in Xiayu Township, Longxi County of Zhangzhou, China (present-day Longhai City). At the age of 25, he left China to Nanyang in search of a better life. He arrived in Penang, then later migrated to Thailand in 1822. Soo Cheang established a tin mining and shipping empire. He was appointed governor of Ranong Province in 1854 and given the princely title of Phraya Na Ranong by the royal family. He became primogenitor of the Khaw na Ranong family, one of the most prominent Thai Chinese families in Thailand.

Descendents  
Khaw Sim Kong (1840-1912): Governor of Ranong. 
Khaw Sim Bee (1857–1913): Governor of Trang. 
Khaw Joo Ghee (-1932): Governor of Ranong. 
Wichit na Ranong – known to many as the Father of Phuket Tourism. 
Kittiratt Na-Ranong: Thai Finance Minister.

References

Chinese emigrants to Thailand
Khaw na Ranong family
Tax farmers of Siam
1797 births
1882 deaths
People from Zhangzhou
Chao mueang of Thailand